Fusarium oxysporum f.sp. spinacia is a fungal plant pathogen. It is a forma specialis of F. o. on spinach.

Biological control
Clostridium beijerinckii was found by Ueki et al. 2019 to suppress the pathogen when amended to the soil.

References

External links
 Index Fungorum
 USDA ARS Fungal Database

oxysporum f.sp. spinacia
Fungal plant pathogens and diseases
Forma specialis taxa
Fungi described in 1940